= Doonya =

- Founders: Priya Pandya; Kajal Desai
- Headquarters: New York City; Washington, DC, United States
- Website: www.doonya.com

Doonya is a dance-fitness movement that blends Eastern and Western approaches to wellness.

== Background ==
Doonya, which means “world” in Hindi, Urdu and Arabic, uses the art and drama of Bollywood music and dance along with the science of fitness and exercise to create the Doonya workout program.

The workout can be done through its classes, fitness party events and/or its at-home series available on iTunes, Amazon, Xbox and on DVD. Participants can train to become Doonya Ambassadors and trainers and are given tools to spread Doonya to their local communities.

The company has been featured or mentioned in publications and media including the Oprah Winfrey Show, Live with Kelly & Michael, Today Show, Dr. Oz, CBS Early Show, Fitness, Elle, Prevention, Glamour, Health, New York Times, Washington Post, Washingtonian, Self, and Parade.

== History ==
The creators of the program, Priya Pandya and Kajal Desai both grew up in the United States to Indian immigrant parents. They started Doonya in Washington, D.C., as a way to bring a bi-cultural approach to the dance and fitness worlds and began teaching the program in the Virginia, Maryland and DC area. In 2009, when Doonya was invited to perform on the Oprah Winfrey Show, Priya launched Doonya in New York City and the company developed its signature workout program, a 55 minute high-intensity cardio and conditioning class. In 2013, Doonya released its at-home workout series, while in 2014, Doonya served as Global Fitness Ambassadors for Reebok International, created a fitness series for Weight Watchers as well as a 14 episode TV series for Zee Television North America called Doonya: The Bollywood Workout.

== The Program ==
Doonya choreography incorporates four key dance styles.

- Pop Bhangra: a modernized version of Bhangra
- Village Celebration: incorporates Garba, Rajasthani and other folk styles of dance
- Classical Conditioning: Indian classical dance styles such as Bharatanatyam and Kathak
- Bollypop: South Asian styles with other world styles of dance

== Flagship New York City Fitness Center ==
In September 2014, Doonya opened the Doonya Fitness Center: Flatiron, NYC, its flagship fitness center at 1158 Broadway in New York City. The flagship also hosts a D60 structured fitness goals based community challenge three times a year. Doonya Fitness Center events and parties also offer nutrition, mental wellness and community building activities for a holistic approach to the Doonya philosophy.

== Team ==
Priya Pandya is CEO of the company and Kajal Desai heads product development as resident Chief Choreographer in Houston, Texas. There are Doonya trainers and ambassadors in NYC, Houston, Washington, D.C., Los Angeles, San Francisco, Mumbai, and Delhi.
